Jørgen Vodsgaard (born October 22, 1942) is a former Danish handball player who competed in the 1972 Summer Olympics. He played his club handball with Aarhus KFUM.

He was a leading figure in the 1967 World Championship Silver winning Denmark men's national handball team. In 1972 he was part of the Danish team which finished thirteenth in the Olympic tournament. He played four matches and scored six goals.

Also known as the co-founder and CEO of Danish-based sportswear brand Hummel A/S (Hummel International Sport and Leisure).

References

1942 births
Living people
Danish male handball players
Olympic handball players of Denmark
Handball players at the 1972 Summer Olympics